Mohammad-Javad Mohammadizadeh (born 1951) is an Iranian politician who was Vice President and Head of Environmental Protection Organization of Iran from August 2009 when he replaced Fatemeh Javadi until September 2013. He was formerly Governor of Razavi Khorasan Province and Lorestan Province.

External links
Portall in Presidential site

Iranian paleontologists
Heads of Department of Environment (Iran)
Living people
Governors of Razavi Khorasan Province
1951 births
Governors of Lorestan Province